Watt's pipistrelle (Pipistrellus wattsi) is a species of vesper bat found only in Papua New Guinea.

References

Pipistrellus
Mammals described in 1986
Taxa named by Darrell Kitchener
Bats of Oceania
Endemic fauna of Papua New Guinea
Mammals of Papua New Guinea
Taxonomy articles created by Polbot
Bats of New Guinea